Series 43 of University Challenge began on 15 July 2013 on BBC Two.

Results
Winning teams are highlighted in bold.
Teams with green scores (winners) returned in the next round, while those with red scores (losers) were eliminated.
Teams with orange scores must win one more match to return in the next round (current highest scoring losers, teams that won their first quarter-final match, teams that won their second quarter-final match having lost their first, or teams that won their first quarter-final match and lost their second).
Teams with yellow scores indicate that two further matches must be played and won (teams that lost their first quarter-final match).
A score in italics indicates a match decided on a tie-breaker question.

First round

Highest scoring losers play-offs

Second round

Quarter-finals

Semi-finals

Final

 The trophy and title were awarded to the Trinity team comprising (left to right) Matthew Ridley, Filip Drnovšek Zorko, Ralph Morley (captain) and Richard Freeland.
 The trophy was presented by Jeanette Winterson.

Spin-off: Christmas Special 2013
Each year, a Christmas special sequence is aired featuring distinguished alumni. Out of 7 first-round winners, the top 4 highest-scoring teams progress to the semi-finals. The teams consist of  celebrities who represent their alma maters.

Results
Winning teams are highlighted in bold.
Teams with green scores (winners) returned in the next round, while those with red scores (losers) were eliminated.
Teams with grey scores won their match but did not achieve a high enough score to proceed to the next round.
A score in italics indicates a match decided on a tie-breaker question.

First Round

Standings for the winners

Semi-finals

Final

The Gonville and Caius College, Cambridge team of Quentin Stafford-Fraser, Helen Castor, Mark Damazer and Lars Tharp beat Emmanuel College, Cambridge and their team of Hugo Rifkind, Mary-Ann Ochota, Simon Singh and Rory McGrath.

References

External links
University Challenge homepage
Blanchflower Results Table

2014
2013 British television seasons
2014 British television seasons